Mauro Luis Veit (born December 21, 1983 in Santa Clara do Sul-RS), or simply Maurinho, is a Brazilian defensive midfielder who last played for Goiás.

References

External links 
CBF 

zerozero.pt 
goiasesporteclube 

1983 births
Living people
Brazilian footballers
Santa Cruz Futebol Clube players
Grêmio Esportivo Brasil players
Goiás Esporte Clube players
Brazilian people of German descent
Association football midfielders